Omicron Draconis (Latinised as ο Draconis, abbreviated to ο Dra) is a giant star in the constellation Draco located 322.93 light years from the Earth. Its path in the night sky is circumpolar for latitudes greater than 31o north, meaning the star never rises or sets when viewed in the night sky.

Omicron Draconis can be considered the north pole star of Mercury, as it is the closest star to Mercury's north celestial pole.

This is a single-lined spectroscopic binary system, but the secondary has been detected using interferometry.  It is an RS Canum Venaticorum variable system with eclipses.  The total amplitude of variation is only a few hundredths of a magnitude.  The secondary star is similar to the Sun, presumably a main sequence star, while the primary is a giant star 25 times larger than the Sun and two hundred times more luminous.

References

External links
 2004. Starry Night Pro, Version 5.8.4. Imaginova. . www.starrynight.com

Draconis, Omicron
Draco (constellation)
G-type giants
RS Canum Venaticorum variables
Eclipsing binaries
Draconis, 47
092512
7125
175306
Durchmusterung objects